The Thailand Cultural Centre (Thai; ศูนย์วัฒนธรรมแห่งประเทศไทย) is a performing arts venue in Huai Khwang district, Bangkok, Thailand.

History
Built with a grant from Japan, the Thailand Cultural Centre opened on 9 October 1987 as part of celebrations for King Bhumibol's 60th birthday.

Facilities

The venue consists of two auditoriums and one outdoor stage and is used for various live performances year round. The main hall is a 2,000-seat auditorium, and is used for stage presentations, concerts, and conferences. The small hall is a 500-seat multi-purpose auditorium, which is integrated with a 1,000-seat outdoor amphitheater. The Social Education and Exhibition Building accommodates a cultural library and the Thai Life Permanent Exhibition. There is also a Japanese Pavilion and a Thai Pavilion.

Location
The centre is on 14 Thiam Ruam Mit Road, close to the junction with Ratchadaphisek Road, in the Huai Khwang District.

Metro station
The MRT has a station called Thailand Cultural Centre. It is located on a different street and about 700 walk from the Cultural Centre Building. The station has been designed to be an interchange providing future connection with the Orange Line. The Orange Line is planned to run from Bang Kapi to Bang Bamru and cut perpendicularly with the Blue Line at Thailand Cultural Centre station.

References

External links 
Locality map of Thailand Cultural Centre Station

Theatres in Bangkok
Culture of Bangkok
Cultural centres in Thailand
Music venues in Thailand
Huai Khwang district
Event venues established in 1987
1987 establishments in Thailand
Convention centers in Thailand
Opera houses in Thailand